Frans "Cirkus" Persson (6 December 1891 – 13 January 1976) was a Swedish gymnast. He competed as part of the Swedish men's gymnastics team when they won a gold medal in the 1920 Summer Olympics.

References

1891 births
1976 deaths
Swedish male artistic gymnasts
Gymnasts at the 1920 Summer Olympics
Olympic gymnasts of Sweden
Olympic gold medalists for Sweden
Olympic medalists in gymnastics
Medalists at the 1920 Summer Olympics